Samaira Mehta is an American coder and inventor. She is the founder and chief executive officer of CoderBunnyz.

Life 
Mehta is from Santa Clara, California. Her father is an engineer. She began coding when she was 6 years old with her father as her teacher. She created the board game CoderBunnyz, with the help of her little brother, to teach other children how to code. She designed the game over the course of a year. Mehta speaks at workshops and conferences including at Microsoft, Intel, and Google. She first started presenting at workshops at the Santa Clara City Library. She spoke at the 2019 C2 Montréal Conference. Mehta aims to eliminate gender bias and increase the number of women in engineering.

CoderBunnyz 
The name, CoderBunnyz, combines her interest in board games and coding with bunnies, her favorite animal. The game provides instruction on basic concepts in artificial intelligence and Java. It includes five major topics including training, back propagation, inference, adaptive learning, and autonomous. The STEM game is used in over 106 schools.

Awards and honors 
In 2016, Mehta won the $2,500 second-place prize at Think Tank Learning's Pitchfest. She received a letter from former first lady Michelle Obama.

References 

Living people
Year of birth missing (living people)
21st-century American businesspeople
21st-century American inventors
21st-century American businesswomen
Women inventors
American computer programmers
Board game designers
American game designers
People from Santa Clara, California
American child businesspeople
American people of Indian descent